This article show all participating team squads at the 2003 FIVB Women's Volleyball World Grand Prix, played by twelve countries from 21 July to 3 August 2003 with the final round held in Gioia del Colle, Matera, Italy.

The following is the Brazil roster in the 2003 FIVB World Grand Prix.

The following is the Canada roster in the 2003 FIVB World Grand Prix.

The following is the China roster in the 2003 FIVB World Grand Prix.

The following is the Cuba roster in the 2003 FIVB World Grand Prix.

The following is the Germany roster in the 2003 FIVB World Grand Prix.

The following is the Italy roster in the 2003 FIVB World Grand Prix.

The following is the Japan roster in the 2003 FIVB World Grand Prix.

The following is the Netherlands roster in the 2003 FIVB World Grand Prix.

The following is the Russia roster in the 2003 FIVB World Grand Prix.

The following is the South Korea roster in the 2003 FIVB World Grand Prix.

The following is the Thailand roster in the 2003 FIVB World Grand Prix.

The following is the United States roster in the 2003 FIVB World Grand Prix.

References

External links
FIVB
Teams Composition at FIVB.org

2003
2003 in volleyball
International volleyball competitions hosted by Italy
2003 in Italian sport